"Evil Eye" is a song by Scottish recording artist KT Tunstall. It was released as the UK first promotional single off her fifth studio album KIN. The song was released at the same time as the Golden State EP along with the songs "All or Nothing", "The Healer", and a remix of it. It was released through iTunes on 16 June 2016.

Tunstall worked with Tony Hoffer on the song. A music video was released on 20 June 2016 on Vevo, it was directed by Tunstall herself. It has also been played live in the Billboard building.

Track listing

References

2016 songs
2016 singles
KT Tunstall songs
Songs written by KT Tunstall
Sony Music singles
Caroline Records singles